Patrick Bullard (born February 6, 1959) is a Canadian-American television writer, host, producer and comedian.

Biography
Born in Mississauga, Ontario, Bullard wrote for such sitcoms as Roseanne, Reba, Two Guys, a Girl and a Pizza Place, Grace Under Fire and Last Man Standing. He has made guest appearances on Reba, The Jamie Kennedy Experiment, and other shows.

He hosted four game shows: Baloney, Hold Everything, Love Connection (1998–1999) and Card Sharks (2001); as well as his eponymous talk show, The Pat Bullard Show (1996). He hosted the reality show Here Come the Newlyweds on ABC (2008–09).

Bullard has been a producer on various television series including Grace Under Fire, Reba, and Last Man Standing.

Family
He is the younger brother of Mike Bullard and appeared on his brother's show, Open Mike with Mike Bullard, during the first New Year's Eve special. 
His older half-brother is the musician Chuck Jackson of the Downchild Blues Band. He is married and has 4 children.

References

External links

1959 births
Living people
Canadian stand-up comedians
American game show hosts
Canadian game show hosts
Canadian Screen Award winners
Canadian television writers
American television producers
American television writers
Writers from Mississauga
Canadian male comedians
20th-century Canadian comedians
21st-century Canadian comedians